Paul S. Creaghan (born March 27, 1937) was a Canadian politician. He served in the Legislative Assembly of New Brunswick from 1974 to 1978 from the electoral district of Moncton West, a member of the Progressive Conservative party.

References

1937 births
Living people
People from Moncton
Progressive Conservative Party of New Brunswick MLAs